French Squash Federation ("Fédération Française de Squash" in French), also known as the FFSquash is an organisation set up in 1980 that takes charge of the organisation, co-ordination and promotion of squash in France. It is recognised by the World Squash Federation and by the French Minister for Sports.

External links
 Official site (in French)

See also
 France men's national squash team
 France women's national squash team
 French Junior Open Squash
 2013 Men's World Team Squash Championships
 2012 Women's World Team Squash Championships
 Open International de Squash de Nantes

Squash in France
Squash
National members of the World Squash Federation
1980 establishments in France
Sports organizations established in 1980